Elvy Robichaud (born April 3, 1951 in Tracadie-Sheila, New Brunswick) is a former Canadian politician.  He last served in 2006 as the member of the Legislative Assembly of New Brunswick for Tracadie-Sheila.

Education
Robichaud was educated at the University of Moncton where he received Bachelor of Physical Education, Bachelor of Education and Master of Education degrees.  He was a school principal and later a hospital administrator through the 1980s and early 1990s.

Politics
While at the University of Moncton he was involved in student government and was elected to Tracadie municipal council in 1983 serving one three-year term.  He was elected to the Legislative Assembly of New Brunswick in a by-election in 1994.  A Progressive Conservative, he was the first of his party to win a seat in the area since 1912.  His party was struggling at the time and was a third party in the legislature.

He was re-elected in 1995 when his party regained the status of official opposition under the leadership former federal cabinet minister Bernard Valcourt.  When Valcourt resigned as leader in 1997, Robichaud served as interim leader until the election of Bernard Lord and as leader of the opposition from Valcourt's resignation until Lord won a seat in a by-election in 1998.

Robichaud was again elected in 1999 and his party was victorious across the province. He was sworn into the cabinet as Minister of Education and served as education minister until 2001 when he was shuffled into the health portfolio.

Robichaud was again re-elected in 2003 and continued in the cabinet.  On January 31, 2006 he announced he would not run again and would step down from the cabinet the next time it was shuffled.   He left the cabinet following the shuffle on February 14, 2006.

For the 2006 New Brunswick election he served as Conservative campaign chairman.

References 
 

1951 births
Living people
Université de Moncton alumni
Acadian people
Progressive Conservative Party of New Brunswick MLAs
Members of the Executive Council of New Brunswick
People from Gloucester County, New Brunswick
New Brunswick municipal councillors
21st-century Canadian politicians